In mathematics, in particular the subfield of algebraic geometry, a rational map or rational mapping is a kind of partial function between algebraic varieties.  This article uses the convention that varieties are irreducible.

Definition

Formal definition
The proof that this defines an equivalence relation relies on the following lemma:

 If two morphisms of varieties are equal on some non-empty open set, then they are equal.
 is said to be birational if there exists a rational map  which is its inverse, where the composition is taken in the above sense.

Even a cursory examination of the definitions reveals a similarity between that of rational map and that of rational function; in fact, a rational function is just a rational map whose range is the projective line. Composition of functions then allows us to "pull back" rational functions along a rational map, so that a single rational map  induces a homomorphism of fields . In particular, the following theorem is central: the functor from the category of projective varieties with dominant rational maps (over a fixed base field, for example ) to the category of finitely generated field extensions of the base field with reverse inclusion of extensions as morphisms, which associates each variety to its function field and each map to the associated map of function fields, is an equivalence of categories.

Examples

Rational maps of projective spaces 
There is a rational map  sending a ratio . Since the point  cannot have an image, this map is only rational, and not a morphism of varieties. More generally, there are rational maps  sending for  sending an -tuple to an -tuple by forgetting the last coordinates.

Inclusions of open subvarieties 
On a connected variety , the inclusion of any open subvariety  is a birational equivalence since the two varieties have equivalent function fields.

Covering spaces on open subsets 
Covering spaces on open subsets of a variety give ample examples of rational maps which are not birational. For example, Belyi's theorem states that every algebraic curve  admits a map  which ramifies at three points. Then, there is an associated covering space  which defines a dominant rational morphism which is not birational. Another class of examples come from Hyperelliptic curves which are double covers of  ramified at a finite number of points. This gives a ramified cover. For example, the Cubic surface given by the vanishing locus  has a rational map to  sending . This rational map can be expressed as the degree  field extension

Resolution of singularities 
One of the canonical examples of a birational map is the Resolution of singularities. Over a field of characteristic 0, every singular variety  has an associated nonsingular variety  with a birational map . Then, the birational map is given by normalization.

Birational equivalence
Two varieties are said to be birationally equivalent if there exists a birational map between them; this theorem states that birational equivalence of varieties is identical to isomorphism of their function fields as extensions of the base field.  This is somewhat more liberal than the notion of isomorphism of varieties (which requires a globally defined morphism to witness the isomorphism, not merely a rational map), in that there exist varieties which are birational but not isomorphic.

The usual example is that  is birational to the variety  contained in  consisting of the set of projective points  such that , but not isomorphic.

via the map . Note that at no time did we actually produce a rational map, though tracing through the proof of the theorem it is possible to do so.

See also
 Birational geometry
Blowing up
Function field of an algebraic variety
Resolution of singularities
Minimal model program
Log structure

References
 ,  section I.4.

Algebraic geometry